Fanx Ta-Ra is the first studio album by the English band Sad Café. It was produced and engineered by John Punter and released by RCA Records in September 1977. The album charted at number 56 on the UK Albums Chart. The album was not released in North America; however, a compilation of the band's first two albums was released there in late 1978, titled Misplaced Ideals.

Track listing

Personnel
Sad Café

Paul Young – lead vocals, percussion
Ashley Mulford – lead guitar
Tony Cresswell – drums, percussion, backing vocals
John Stimpson – bass guitar, acoustic guitar, backing vocals
Vic Emerson – keyboards
Ian Wilson – guitar, backing vocals

Additional personnel

Lenni Zaksen, Chris Gill – saxophones
Dave Hassle – cabasa, bell tree
John Punter – engineer, producer
Vic Emerson – strings arrangement and synthesisation
Gered Mankowitz – photography

References

1977 debut albums
Sad Café (band) albums
Albums produced by John Punter
RCA Records albums